Mireille Delmas-Marty (10 May 1941 – 12 February 2022) was a French jurist, honorary professor at the Collège de France, and a member of the Academy of Moral and Political Sciences.  She was a member of numerous legislative and constitutional commissions, such as the member of the Criminal Code Reform Commission, president of the commission "Criminal Justice and Human Rights", coordinator of the Committee of Experts of the European Union on the project "Corpus Juris", and chairman of the Supervisory Committee of the European Anti-Fraud Office. She was also one of the 25 leading figures on the Information and Democracy Commission launched by Reporters Without Borders.

In 2021 she was elected to the American Philosophical Society. She died in Saint-Germain-Laval, Loire on 12 February 2022, at the age of 80.

References

1941 births
2022 deaths
20th-century French lawyers
21st-century French lawyers
French women lawyers
Lawyers from Paris
Academic staff of Pantheon-Sorbonne University
Academic staff of the Collège de France
Members of the American Philosophical Society
Members of the Académie des sciences morales et politiques
Members of the Royal Academy of Belgium
Grand Officiers of the Légion d'honneur
Grand Officers of the Ordre national du Mérite
Chevaliers of the Ordre des Palmes Académiques
20th-century women lawyers
21st-century women lawyers